Brandon Robinson (born March 25, 1989) is an American professional basketball player. He was named NBL Canada Rookie of the Year and All-Star Game Most Valuable Player in 2012. Robinson played with Seminole State College of Florida and Clayton State University at the college level.

High school career 
Robinson attended Lake Wales High School in Lake Wales, Florida. He played two seasons of varsity basketball and acted as the team captain as a senior. In his final year with Lake Wales, Robinson averaged 14 points and the team finished with a 21–5 record.

College career 
In his first two years of college, Robinson attended Seminole Community College in Sanford, Florida, where he played college basketball under head coach Bobby Washington. After his freshman season, he averaged 12 points and four rebounds, shooting .490 on field goals. Robinson averaged 18 points and six rebounds as a sophomore and earned first-team FCCAA All-Mid-Florida Conference and second-team NJCAA All-Region accolades.

Before his junior year, Robinson transferred to Clayton State University in Morrow, Georgia. The school's basketball program competed in the NCAA Division II. After starting in all 29 of his games under head coach Gordon Gibbons, he averaged 14 points and 5 rebounds. Robinson recorded a career-high 21 points against Augusta State. He also notched a season-best nine rebounds vs. North Georgia. As a senior, Robinson averaged 20 points and six rebounds, shooting .432 from the field. He scored a career-high 31 points at the Peach Belt Conference Tournament. The forward earned first-team All-Peach Belt and NABC Division II All-Southeast Region honors following the season. In March 2011, Robinson was named a Division II All-American, becoming the first Clayton State player to do so under Gibbons and the second in school history.

Professional career

Stint in Canada
In October 2011, Robinson was named to the 18-man training camp roster Oshawa Power, who would play in the inaugural 2011–12 National Basketball League of Canada (NBL) season. On October 30, he debuted for the Power, scored 16 points in a loss to the Quebec Kebs. He was named NBL Canada Player of the Week on January 30, 2012, after posting 34 points vs. the Saint John Mill Rats. He earned Player of the Week honors once again on February 20, following a season-high 37-point performance in a rematch with the Mill Rats. By the end of the season, Robinson averaged 19.6 points per game, making him the league's leading scorer. He was named Rookie of the Year as well. In April 2011, Robinson scored 38 points at the NBL Canada All-Star Game and was then named All-Star Game Most Valuable Player.

The Basketball Tournament (TBT) (2015–present) 

In the summers of 2015, '16, and 2017, Robinson played in The Basketball Tournament on ESPN for Pedro's Posse.  In 2016, he helped lead Pedro's Posse to the Super 16 Round in the tournament, averaging 17.8 points per game, also shooting 86 percent from the free-throw line.  In 2017, Robinson scored 19 points in Pedro's Posse's first round loss to Team 23 by a score of 107–92.

Club Deportes Las Animas (2018)
Robinson signed with the Chilean basketball team, Club Deportes Las Animas. On November 5, 2017, Brandon Robinson scored 47 points on 14-of-23 shooting from the field in a 96-94 win over Osorno Básquetbol.

China (2018–2019)
Robinson signed with Hebei Kylins, a team that is playing in the NBL-China. On June 26, 2019, Robinson scored a career-high 70 points (including a career-high 13 3-pointers made) and grabbed a career-high 21 rebounds in a 117–139 loss to the Henan Golden Elephants.

Quimsa (2019–2020)
On August 13, 2019, Robinson signed with Atletica Quimsa of the Liga Nacional de Básquet. He helped the team win the regular season and averaged 18.3 points, 2.5 rebounds and 2.7 assists per game.

Astros de Jalisco (2020)
In 2020, Robinson signed with Astros de Jalisco of the Liga Nacional de Baloncesto Profesional. In 14 games, he averaged 13.1 points, 2.8 rebounds and 2.1 assists per game. Robinson parted ways with the team on October 17.

Personal life 
Brandon was born on March 25, 1989 to mother Trelliss Robinson. His uncle, Fred Dean, played football as an offensive lineman. Dean won Super Bowl XVII with the Washington Redskins. While growing up, Robinson looked up to Michael Jordan and supported the Orlando Magic. While at Clayton State University, he majored in integrated studies.

References 

1989 births
Living people
American expatriate basketball people in Argentina
American expatriate basketball people in Canada
American expatriate basketball people in China
American expatriate basketball people in Chile
American expatriate basketball people in Germany
American expatriate basketball people in Mexico
American men's basketball players
Basketball players from Florida
Clayton State Lakers men's basketball players
Crailsheim Merlins players
Flamengo basketball players
Forwards (basketball)
Halifax Rainmen players
Island Storm players
Junior college men's basketball players in the United States
Mississauga Power players
NINERS Chemnitz players
People from Lake Wales, Florida
Seminole State College of Florida alumni
Sportspeople from Polk County, Florida
Windsor Express players
Astros de Jalisco players
Quimsa basketball players